Askeran Fortress is a fortress in the town of Askeran. Located on the banks of the Qarqar River, it was built by the Karabakh Khanate ruler Panah Ali Khan and consists of two sections. The left-bank section features a double line of stone walls.

During the Russo-Persian War of 1804–1813 the Russian encampment was near the fortress. In 1810 the peace talks between the Russians and Persians were conducted at the fortress.

In the Middle Ages, on this place there was a fortress and an Armenian village called Mayraberd.

During 2018, the walls and towers of the fortress were restored. The purpose of the restoration is to preserve the monument, as well as making the place of interest for tourists.

Gallery

Notes

Buildings and structures completed in 1751
Castles and fortresses in Azerbaijan
Russo-Persian Wars
1751 establishments in Iran